This is a list of Calgary Transit bus terminals that serve destinations Calgary's city limits.

List of Bus Terminals

References

Calgary-related lists
Calgary
Calgary Transit
Bus stations, Calgary
Bus stations in Alberta